Muraleedharan Pillai, popularly known as Murali (25 May 1954 – 6 August 2009) was an Indian film, stage and television actor and author. He mainly appeared in Malayalam films and a few Tamil films and also many other movies. He won the National Film Award for Best Actor for his portrayal of Appa Mestry, a communist freedom fighter and professional weaver in the 2002 film Neythukaran. He was known for his powerful portrayal of character roles, lead roles and negative roles.

Murali started his film career playing villain roles and soon turned to character acting. He played the leading role in the 1992 film Aadhaaram, which gave a "break" to his career. The film was well received at the box office and Murali ascended to the status of a star in Malayalam cinema, which he enjoyed for a few years during the 1990s.
Besides acting, he was the chairman of the Kerala Sangeetha Nataka Academy from 2006 until his death. He also authored five books, and was also a Sangeetha Nataka Academy award winner. He contested at the 1999 Lok Sabha polls as a communist candidate without success. He was also the Director of the CPI(M) promoted television company Malayalam Communications Limited, which runs Malayalam TV channels Kairali TV, People TV and We TV. His last film was the 2009 Tamil film Aadhavan. He is one of the founders of the Malayalam film actors association AMMA.

Early life
Murali was born on 25 May 1954 as the first of five children to P. Krishna Pillai and K. Devaki Amma at Kudavattoor, Kollam, Kerala, India. He has four siblings, Thulasi, Sheela, Harikumar and Sheeja. He did his schooling from Kudavattoor L. P. School and Thrikannamangalam S. K. V. High School. He passed the pre-degree from M.G. College, Thiruvananthapuram and his Degree from Devaswom Board College, Sasthamkotta. He was an active member of the Students Federation of India. He took an LL.B degree from the Kerala Law Academy Law College, Thiruvananthapuram. After studies, he worked for some years as Lower Division Clerk in the Department of Health, Government of Kerala and as Upper Division Clerk in the office of Kerala University. He was married to his first cousin Mini and has a daughter Karthika. His daughter married Sonoop R. Nair on 15 July 2016

Career

Film actor
Murali debuted in films with the lead role in Njattadi, directed by Bharath Gopi. But the film was never released. He then got chance to act in Chidambaram, directed by the National Award-winning filmmaker Aravindan. He then acted in Meenamasathile Sooryan and Panchagni, directed by Lenin Rajendran and Hariharan, respectively. Panchagni got released first and it gave him the break in his acting career. He soon established himself as a powerful actor in the Malayalam film industry. Aadhaaram, directed by George Kittu, was the first film to be released with Murali in a lead role. He acted in a variety of roles, ranging from lead roles to villain roles, and won accolades. Some of his other notable films include Nee Ethra Dhanya, Dhanam, The King, Pathram, Chakoram, Veeralippattu, Achan Kombathu Amma Varambathu, Meenamasathile Sooryan, Swarnam, Kaarunyam and The Truth"Amaram". Also worth-mentioning are his remarkable portrayals as a toddy tapper in Malayogam and as trade union leader in Varavelppu.

Murali acted in the longest TV commercial ever on Indian TV, spanning 150 seconds. This was for Air Deccan in 2005.

Stage actor
Murali was actively involved with Natyagriham, a drama venture started by actor Narendra Prasad. Murali won critical acclaim for his portrayal of Ravana in the Malayalam play Lanka Lakshmi, which was based on C. N. Sreekantan Nair's novel of the same name. He was also associated with G. Sankara Pillai in doing theatre plays.

Author
Murali authored five books. His book on Kumaranasan, Abhinethavum Asan Kavithayum (Actor and Asan's Poetry) won him the Sangeetha Nataka Academy award. One of his other critically acclaimed books was Abhinyathinte Rasathanthram (Chemistry of Acting).

Politician
Murali was a member of Communist Party of India (Marxist) and has contested the 1999 Lok Sabha polls from the Alappuzha constituency as a Left Democratic Front candidate, but lost to V. M. Sudheeran of Indian National Congress.

Death
Murali died in Thiruvananthapuram on 6 August 2009 at the age of 55, due to acute diabetes which led to a heart attack at 8.20 PM IST. He was cremated with full state honours at his home in Aruvikkara, which he had bought some years prior to his death.

Awards
National Film Awards:
 2001 – Best Actor – Neythukaaran

Kerala State Film Awards:
 1992– Best Actor – Aadhaaram 
 1996 – Best Actor – Kaanakkinavu
 1998 – Best Actor – Thalolam
 2001 – Best Actor – Neythukaaran
 1991 – Second Best Actor – Amaram
 2007 – Second Best Actor – Veeralipattu, Pranayakalam
Kerala state TV Awards
2008– Kerala State Television Award for Best Actor – Aranazhikaneram

Filmfare Awards:
 1992 – Best Actor – Aadharam

Other awards:
 Madras Film Fans Award
 Kerala Film Critics Award
 Shivaram Award
 Best columnist award: for his feature "Vyazhaporul" in the Malayala Manorama newspaper

Filmography

As actor

Malayalam

Tamil

Telugu

Hindi

Story
 Ennu Nadhante Nimmi (1986)

Television career
Aranazhika Neram (Amrita TV)
Sakunam ( DD Malayalam)

Posthumous recognition
The Bharat Murali Cultural Centre was established at his birthplace, Kudavattoor. It presents the annual Bharat Murali Award to distinguished contributors to Malayalam cinema.

 1st (2010) - K. P. A. C. Lalitha, actress; Kuttyedathi, actress
 2nd (2011) - Manoj K. Jayan, actor
 3rd (2012) - Kaviyoor Ponnamma, actress
 7th (2016) - Surabhi Lakshmi, actress; Indrans, actor
 9th (2020) - Vijith Nambiar, director

References

External links
 
 Murali at MSI
 Official Website of Information and Public Relation Department of Kerala

Best Actor National Film Award winners
Politicians from Kollam
2009 deaths
Kerala State Film Award winners
People from Kollam district
Male actors from Kollam
1954 births
Indian actor-politicians
Male actors in Malayalam cinema
Indian male film actors
Male actors in Tamil cinema
Filmfare Awards South winners
Communist Party of India (Marxist) politicians from Kerala
Male actors in Malayalam television
Indian male television actors
20th-century Indian male actors
21st-century Indian male actors
20th-century Indian politicians
21st-century Indian politicians
Malayalam film producers
Film producers from Thiruvananthapuram
Malayalam screenwriters
Screenwriters from Thiruvananthapuram
20th-century Indian dramatists and playwrights
20th-century Indian screenwriters